Midwest Airways was an airline headquartered on the grounds of Lunken Field in Cincinnati, Ohio. It operated flights from Cincinnati to Cleveland, Ohio and Detroit, Michigan. It had three Lockheed Model 10 Electras.

See also 
 List of defunct airlines of the United States

References

Defunct airlines of the United States
Defunct companies based in Cincinnati